Lundia is a genus of flowering plants belonging to the family Bignoniaceae.

Its native range is Mexico to southern Tropical America. It is found in the countries of Belize, Bolivia, Brazil, Colombia, Costa Rica, Ecuador, French Guiana, Guatemala, Guyana, Mexico, Nicaragua, Panamá, Peru, Suriname, Trinidad-Tobago and Venezuela.

The genus name of Lundia is in honour of Peter Wilhelm Lund (1801–1880), a Danish palaeontologist, zoologist and archaeologist.
It was first described and published in Biblioth. Universelle Genève, n.s., Vol.17 on page 127 in 1838.

Known species
According to Kew;

Lundia cordata 
Lundia corymbifera 
Lundia damazioi 
Lundia densiflora 
Lundia erionema 
Lundia gardneri 
Lundia glazioviana 
Lundia helicocalyx 
Lundia laevis 
Lundia nitidula 
Lundia obliqua 
Lundia puberula 
Lundia spruceana 
Lundia virginalis

References

Bignoniaceae
Bignoniaceae genera
Plants described in 1838
Flora of Central America